Brent is an Old English given name and surname. The place name can be from Celtic words meaning "holy one" (if it refers to the River Brent), or "high place", literally, "from a steep hill" (if it refers to the villages in Somerset and Devon). The surname often indicates that one's ancestors lived in a place called Brent.

Brent has also become a regularly used given name in some countries, being among the thousand most common names for boys born in the United States since 1933. When used as a given name today, Brent is sometimes a short form of Brenton, but this was probably not the original inspiration for Brent's use as a given name, since Brenton's own regular use as a first name came many years after Brent was established in that role.

Notable people

Surname
 Bix Brent (1923–1972), American singer
 Charles Brent (1862–1929), Canadian-born missionary bishop of the Philippines and Episcopal Church saint
 Dannielle Brent (born 1979), English actress
 Earl K. Brent (1914–1977), American songwriter and composer
 Ebony Rainford-Brent (born 1983), English cricketer
 Elinor Brent-Dyer (1894–1969), British novelist
 Evelyn Brent (1901–1975), American actress
 Gary Brent (born 1976), Zimbabwean cricketer
 George Brent (politician) (died 1699), Virginia planter and legislator
 George Brent (1899–1979), Irish actor
 George William Brent (1821–1872), Virginia politician
 Jon Brent (born 1956), Zimbabwean cricketer
 Joseph Brent (born 1976), American musician
 Joseph Lancaster Brent (1826–1925), Confederate officer and American politician
 Leslie Brent (1925–2019), German immunologist
 Margaret Brent (1601–1671), American/Maryland lawyer, religious leader and planter and women's rights advocate
 Richard P. Brent (born 1946), Australian mathematician and computer scientist
 Richard Brent (politician) (1757–1814), Virginia politician
 Robert Brent (1763–1819), American politician, first mayor of Washington D.C.
 Tim Brent (born 1984), Canadian ice hockey player
 Tony Brent (1927–1993), the stage name of Reginald Hogan Bretagne, British traditional pop music singer, most active in the 1950s
 William Brent Jr. (1783–1848), Virginia politician and American diplomat
 William Lee Brent (1931–2006), hijacker and civil rights activist
 William Leigh Brent (1784–1848), Maryland and Louisiana politician

Given name
Brent Ashabranner (1921–2016), American Peace Corps administrator and children's literature writer
Brent Burns (born 1985), Canadian ice hockey player      
Brent Butt (born 1966), Canadian comedian and actor
Brent Corrigan (born 1986), stage name of American porn actor Sean Paul Lockhart
Brent W. Jett Jr. (born 1958), American astronaut
Brent Jones (born 1963), American football player
Brent Harris, Baltimore Orioles sideline reporter and studio host from 2004 to 2006
Brent Hartinger (born 1971), American writer
Brent Hawkins (born 1983), National Football League player, Canadian Football player
Brent Hinds (born 1974), American singer for the heavy metal band Mastodon
Brent Hinkley (born 1962), American actor in the TV series The Preston Episodes
Brent Johnson (disambiguation), several people
Brent Kite (born 1981), Australian Rugby League player
Brent Ladds (born 1951), Canadian ice hockey administrator
Brent Mayne (born 1968), former Major League Baseball player
Brent Morin (born 1986), American comedian and actor
Brent Musburger (born 1939), American journalist and sportscaster
Brent Mydland (1952–1990), American keyboardist, member of the Grateful Dead
Brent Petrus (born 1975), American football player
Brent Pierce (born 1969), Canadian curler
Brent Rivera (born 1998), American YouTuber, social media personality, and actor
Brent Rooker (born 1994), American professional baseball player
Brent Seabrook (born 1985), Canadian ice hockey defenceman for the Chicago Blackhawks
Brent Scowcroft (born 1925), American general, U.S. National Security Advisor from 1974 to 1977 and 1989 to 1993
Brent Smith (born 1978), American singer for the band Shinedown
Brent Spiner (born 1949), American actor
Brent Sutter (born 1962) Canadian former ice hockey player
Brent Symonette (born 1954), Bahamian politician
Brent Tate (born 1982), Australian Rugby League player
R. Brent Tully (born 1943), American astronomer

References

Sources
 Hanks, P. & Hodges, F. (1988). A dictionary of surnames. New York: Oxford University Press. .
 Mills, A. D. (1991). A dictionary of British place-names. New York: Oxford University Press. .

English toponymic surnames
English given names